The 71st Assembly District of Wisconsin is one of 99 districts in the Wisconsin State Assembly.  Located in central Wisconsin, the district comprises most of Portage County, including the city of Stevens Point and the villages of Almond, Amherst, Plover, Rosholt, and Whiting. The district also contains the University of Wisconsin–Stevens Point campus. The district is represented by Democrat Katrina Shankland, since January 2013.

The 71st Assembly district is located within Wisconsin's 24th Senate district, along with the 70th and 72nd Assembly districts.

List of past representatives

References 

Wisconsin State Assembly districts
Portage County, Wisconsin